RisiKo! is an Italian strategy board game based on Risk. Unlike Risk, the object of the game is the achievement of a predefined, secret target that is different for each player: the target can be either the conquest of a certain number of territories, of two or more continents, or the annihilation of one opponent.

History
RisiKo! derives from the 1957 French game La Conquête du Monde, better known worldwide as Risk.

The first Italian edition dates 1968, published by Milanese publisher Giochiclub that distributed games of several European companies and mixed features of different versions: the name RisiKo! derives from the German version Risiko; the rules were almost identical to the French version, with some notes in the manual taken from the Anglo-American edition; tokens were wooden cube-shaped. As in the first French edition, 3 dice were used for defense, initial forces were distributed more randomly, and players received one card at the beginning of their own turn as well as from conquering territories.

In 1973 Giochiclub published a new version with same rules, but introduced plastic tank-shaped and machinegun-shaped tokens (to represent one and five armies, respectively).

In 1977 Editrice Giochi became the exclusive publisher of RisiKo! and renovated the edition by adopting new rules, among which target cards (before the only aim was to conquer the entire world), the nineteenth-century style planisphere as in the American edition (but with a border between Middle East and China), the random distribution of the initial territories and the balanced distribution of initial armies already present in the European editions. Moreover, flag-shaped tokens were introduced instead of machinegun-shaped tokens.

Features

Board
The board in RisiKo! represents the world subdivided in 42 territories collected in 6 continents.

Each territory is represented by a Territories card. At the beginning of the game, these cards are distributed to players who take related territories. During the game a player can conquest a territory by attacking with his own armies. It is possible to attack a territory only from an adjacent territory.

Armies

Each player command armies groups identified by the colour and by which occupies the territories, attacks and defends.
An army is represented by a tank: each player receives a certain number of tanks depending on the number of players, and can adding others when he starts his turn.

The initial number of tanks for each player is:

 35 if the players are 3;
 30 if the players are 4;
 25 if the players are 5;
 20 if the players are 6.

Targets
At the beginning of the game, each player gains a random Targets card, on which there are written the objectives that the player has to complete in order to win. The targets have to be kept secret for strategic reasons.

The possible objectives are (original version):
to conquer 18 territories and to control them with at least two armies each one;
to conquer 24 territories;
to conquer the whole North America and Africa;
to conquer the whole North America and Oceania;
to conquer the whole Asia and Oceania;
to conquer the whole Asia and Africa;
to conquer the whole Europe, South America and a third continent;
to conquer the whole Europe, Oceania and a third continent;
to destroy completely the armies of a certain colour. If it is impossible (i.e. the player has that colour, or no one has that colour, or the player with that colour was already defeated by another one), then the target becomes to conquer 24 territories.

In tournament rules there are 16 different Targets cards which report graphically those territories to conquer.

Territories
Each of the 42 Territories cards represents a territory and a symbol among cavalry (horseman), infantry (soldier) and artillery (cannon). Moreover, in the deck there are two jokers (representing all three symbols). By the combination of three card it is possible gain a certain number of armies at the turn beginning:

3 cannons = 4 armies (8 in tournament)
3 soldiers = 6 armies (8 in tournament)
3 horsemen = 8 armies
1 cannon, 1 soldier, 1 horseman = 10 armies
1 Joker + 2 cannons or 2 soldiers or 2 horsemen = 12 armies

Moreover, if the player calls for his bonus armies, he gain two more armies for each territory reported on the cards that he controls. The combination must be declared at the turn beginning, before to do any operation.

Rules
Rules are different from the rest of the world, that sees two main groups: European rules and American rules. The Italian RisiKo! rules are unique since the most considerable feature is that the defender can roll up to 3 dice, obtaining in this way an advantage in battles, whereas in American rules already in 1959 was specified that the maximum number of dice in battle was 5 to 3 for the attacker, 2 for the defender.

Notes

References

External links
 Official RisiKo! website
 RisiKo! rules

Board wargames
Children's board games
Multiplayer games
Nerd culture
Risk (game)
Wargames introduced in the 1960s